GC1 or GC-1 may refer to:

Aircraft
Cessna GC-1
Globe Swift (GC-1/1A/1B)

Minor planets
8204 Takabatake (1994 GC1)
9749 Van den Eijnde (1989 GC1)
(10133) 1993 GC1
(10328) 1991 GC1
29869 Chiarabarbara (1999 GC1)

Other
GC-1 (GigaCluster), a transputer system produced by Parsytec
GC-1, an operating division of the Metro Local bus system in Los Angeles, USA
Autopista GC-1, a motorway in Gran Canaria, Spain
 (Combat Group No.1), a unit in the Free French Flight known as "Jam"